The Unocal-Darlington Record Club was a club in the NASCAR Grand National and Winston Cup Series from 1959 to about 2001, based at Darlington Raceway. Membership was achieved based on setting qualifying records during time trials for the annual (Heinz/Mountain Dew/Pepsi) Southern 500 held on Labor Day weekend. During its heyday, it was considered one of the most prestigious and exclusive clubs in motorsports.

The club was sponsored by longtime NASCAR sponsor Unocal/Union 76. Previously it was sponsored by Pure Oil. At some time after the 2001 season, the club was quietly retired, as NASCAR made rule changes that effectively eliminated its usefulness. The club ended permanently when Unocal left the sport in 2003, and the Ferko lawsuit resulted in the Southern 500 moving off of Labor Day weekend for over a decade.

The original eight charter members were selected in 1959: Dick Joslin (Dodge), Marvin Panch (Ford), Joe Caspolich (Oldsmobile), Bob Burdick (Thunderbird), Speedy Thompson (Chevrolet), Richard Petty (Plymouth), Elmo Langley (Buick), and Fireball Roberts (Pontiac). Roberts was selected as the first president; Former Darlington Raceway president Bob Colvin contributed in creating the club.

Membership qualifications
Drivers were awarded membership in the club based on official time trials for the Southern 500. The fastest single driver of each car make (e.g. Chevrolet, Ford, etc.) each won the membership. The general requirements for eligibility were as follows:

Car making the qualifying attempt must be a current model year car.
At least three cars from each car make must be entered for that make to have an automatic berth in the club for that year.
The fastest single driver from each of the various car makes qualified for the club, provided their speed was within 2% of the fastest overall car in the field.

Special provisions were made for other cars:
If only one car from a particular make is entered, that driver was only eligible if he set a track record for that car make; and was within 2% of the fastest overall car in the field (i.e., the pole position winner for the race)
If the car was not a current model year chassis, that driver was only eligible if he was the overall fastest driver for that make (i.e., faster than all the current model year chassis of that same make); and he was within 2% of the fastest overall car in the field.

By 2000, the "within 2%" rule was tightened to "within 1%."

Drivers who qualified for the club attended a special dinner and reception and received a special blue blazer. Drivers who entered the club by setting an overall Darlington track record, however, received the more prestigious white blazer. A ring, a plaque and a cash award were also presented. Entry into the club was a lifetime membership, but only active members participated in actual duties. The reception dinner was held on the Friday of Labor Day weekend (two days prior to the Southern 500), and would recognize the drivers who qualified based on the previous year's event.

Only records set in the September Southern 500 were recognized for the club. Any records set during the spring race, or support races (added in 1983 to the Southern 500 weekend) were not eligible.

Competition Board
Once the membership was established, the active members of the club were eligible for the annual Competition Board. All active members who qualified for the race within 2% of the fastest car in the field (later 1%) were placed on the board. The board's primary responsibilities were to assist NASCAR in training rookies for racing at each race during the season.

Once the Competition Board was established, the board members voted amongst themselves to select the Club President and Club Vice-President. Each had a tenure of one year. The president's duties primarily were to lead the rookie training, and conduct the annual Southern 500 rookie orientation meeting/test. Until 1993, rookies were required to pass a special rookie orientation test (similar to the Indianapolis 500) before attempting to qualify at Darlington for either race. Likewise, they were not allowed to qualify on the first day of time trials, and were relegated to the second round only (starting 21st or lower).

Support races were added in 1977 for the Baby Grand National series for four-cylinder cars, which ran on meetings until 1984.  In 1982, the second-tier series (now the NASCAR Xfinity Series) added a 200 mile race for the Rebel 500 weekend, and in 1983 another second-tier race was run on Southern 500 weekend as a 250-mile race (owing to Blue Laws in South Carolina, the race was set to the state's 250-mile minimum for Sunday races). In 1984, support races for the second-tier series were added to both weekends.  As younger drivers using the series had gained Darlington experience through support races, the rookie panel and NASCAR decided in 1993 to abolish both the rookie test and the first-round rookie prohibition, as even "rookies" in most years had typically made four or more starts through support races.

Record Club by car make

 Note that in 1959 & 1960, the Ford Thunderbird was categorized separately from Ford.

Sources:

Alphabetical member list
Bold indicates track record member (white blazer)

Bobby Allison
Davey Allison
Donnie Allison
John Andretti
H. B. Bailey
Buck Baker
Buddy Baker
Walter Ballard
Earl Balmer
Johnny Benson
Bunkie Blackburn
Dick Brooks
Brett Bodine
Geoff Bodine
Neil Bonnett
Bob Burdick
Ward Burton
Earle Canavan
Joe Caspolich
Neil Castles
Curtis Crider
Darel Dieringer
Dale Earnhardt
Bill Elliott
Harry Gant
Charlie Glotzbach
Jeff Gordon
Pete Hamilton
Bobby Hillin Jr.
T. C. Hunt
Ernie Irvan
Kenny Irwin Jr.*
Dale Jarrett
Bobby Johns
Junior Johnson
Dick Joslin
Alan Kulwicki
Bobby Labonte
Terry Labonte
Elmo Langley
Fred Lorenzen
Tiny Lund
Dave Mader
Dave Marcis
Sterling Marlin
Rick Mast
Jeremy Mayfield
Ed Negre
Cotton Owens
Marvin Panch
Benny Parsons
Jim Pascale
David Pearson
Richard Petty
J.T. Putney
Tim Richmond
Fireball Roberts
Ricky Rudd
Joe Ruttman
Greg Sacks
Ken Schrader
Morgan Shepherd
Mike Skinner
Lake Speed
G.C. Spencer
Larry Thomas
Speedy Thompson
Curtis Turner
Roy Tyner
Rusty Wallace
Darrell Waltrip
Joe Weatherly
Rex White
Jim Whitman
Cale Yarborough
LeeRoy Yarbrough
Emanuel Zervakis

*Posthumous induction.  Irwin won pole and set the track record in 1999 during Pepsi Southern 500 qualifying, but was killed at during Cup practice at the Loudon July race ten months later.

Sources:

One of the award plaques presented to Bobby Allison was featured on the television program American Pickers. It was acquired for display at the NASCAR Hall of Fame.

Club presidents
Tenure runs for 12 months, from September to September of each year.

1960-61 Fireball Roberts
1961-62
1962-63 Buck Baker
1963-64
1964-65
1965-66
1966-67
1967-68
1968-69
1969-70 Bobby Allison
1970-71
1971-72
1972-73
1973-74
1974-75
1975-76
1976-77 Dave Marcis
1977-78
1978-79
1979-80 Donnie Allison
1980-81 Ricky Rudd
1981-82
1982-83
1983-84 Bill Elliott
1984-85 Ricky Rudd
1985-86
1986-87
1987-88 Bobby Hillin Jr.
1988-89 Darrell Waltrip
1989-90
1990-91
1991-92
1992-93
1993-94
1994-95 Bobby Labonte
1996-97 John Andretti
1997-98
1998-99
1999-00 Ricky Rudd
2000-01
2001-02
Ken Schrader
Jeff Gordon

See also
Unocal 76 Challenge
Unocal 76 World Pit Crew Competition

Sources
The Official NASCAR Preview and Press Guide, 1994 & 2001 edition
Rookies get scoop on each track from veteran Rudd, August 31, 2000
Brooks, Allison, Tyner To Be Inducted Into Record Club

References

NASCAR races at Darlington Raceway
NASCAR trophies and awards
NASCAR Cup Series